Gopalpur is a coastal town and a Notified Area Council on the Bay of Bengal coast in Ganjam district in the southern part of Odisha, India. Today it is a commercial port, a famous sea beach and a tourist destination. Gopalpur is around 15 km from Berhampur. The reconstruction of an all weather port including new berths is under development.

Demographics
As of 2001 India census, Gopalpur had a population of 6663. Males constitute 50% of the population and females 50%. Gopalpur has an average literacy rate of 59%, lower than the national average of 59.5%: male literacy is 59%, and female literacy is 42%. In Gopalpur, 12% of the population is under 6 years of age.

History

Ancient Kalinga era
Gopalpur has an ancient sea port which was operational during the heyday of maritime Kalinga region. It is identified with the site Mansurkota located near Gopalpur, just below the mouth of the river Rushikulya. Ptolemy refers to an apheterion or the point of departure located south of Palur port from where ships bound for Southeast Asia embarked on its voyage.

Post-Medieval era
Under the ownership of the Soraine family the village grew in wealth, from an obscure little fishing village, Gopalpur became a prominent trading port. The family built the port, the lighthouse and the Albert Hotel and established both a local fishing industry and a trade route with Burma.

They also established the bylaw allowing any villagers who could build a house, with a perimeter and light a fire in the fireplace overnight, could then keep the land and house (on the backwaters) as their own.

During the British rule family squabbles and disputes resulted in much being transferred to British missionaries. The Albert Hotel now locked in ownership battles and lying derelict is the last remnant of those squabbles.

During the days of British East India Company The East India Company built large warehouses and godowns because the trade with Burma had picked up and it had become a trading point for rice from Rangoon.

Victor Soraine returned to India from England and built BetVic house where he retired, surrounded by memories of childhood and his family legacy. His final wish was granted when he was buried in his ancestral lands just a few years ago.

Gopalpur has reverted to being a quiet, relaxed place but with one major difference — it is one of India's most sought after beaches, with a distinct charm of its own.

Beach

Barely 16 km away from Brahmapur (It is also at times considered as a part of Brahmapur), the commercial hub of southern Odisha and close to the border of Andhra Pradesh, is the tiny town of Gopalpur on the Bay of Bengal. This languorous beach with coconut groves, casuarinas and gentle sand dunes is deserted for miles.

Development

Renovated in the 1970s at the initiative of the Odisha government, the jetties were supposed to revive the trading activities of Gopalpur port. The old jetty in Gopalpur is tourist attraction point, which was a major point for trade and commerce in medieval times. The sailors of those time started their journey from this jetty to Indonesia and Rangoon across the Indian Sea. Once the renovation of new jetty completed it will become an important port of south Odisha. It's a wonderful drive-in for the people and from the beach, a vast expanse of deep blue sea and the horizon can be seen. Another thrilling sight is the long stretch of cashew nut trees. Cashew nuts are processed here and exported. A major landmark of Gopalpur is its lighthouse. The view from the top is splendid and one can see at a glance the entire town of Gopalpur. Gopalour is also famous for its 'beach festival' organized annually. A nearby beach is Dhabaleshwar, which also houses a temple of the same name.

Beach festival and other attractions near Gopalpur

Gopalpur Beach Festival: The first Gopalpur beach festival was started in the year 1996 by Ganjam District Hotel Association to promote tourism and culture. The concept of Gopalpur Beach Festival was conceived by Mr V.Santosh Kumar and Mr Sayed Rahim Members of Ganjam district Hotel Association, Brahmapur. The Ganjam District Hotel Association and Government of Odisha have been jointly organizing the festival since 1996 in the month of December.

Geography and climate
It is a natural, deep sea port on the east coast of India. Gopalpur lies on a 4 km stretch of barren coast line, with no mangrove or tropical forests. The coast line falls in the rain-shadow of the region. The climate in the region is tropical wet and dry. Temperatures range from 32 degrees in summer to 17 degrees in winter. The region receives rainfall in both advance and retreat of the Southwest monsoon. Gopalpur has witnessed notable and strong tropical storms in history, including the Super cyclone of 1999 and Cyclone Phailin of 2013, the latter hitting the town directly.

Politics
Current MLA from Gopalpur (SC) Assembly Constituency is Pradeep panigrahi of BJD, who won the seat in State elections of 2014 and continuing since 2009. Previous MLAs from this seat Trinatha Behera who won this seat in 2004 as INC candidate, Rama Chandra Sethy who won this seat in 2000 as BJD candidate and as JD candidate in 1995 and 1990, and Ghanashyam Behera who won this seat as INC candidate in 1985 and 1977 and as INC(I) candidate in 1980.
Gopalpur is part of Berhampur (Lok Sabha constituency).

Gallery

References

External links
 https://virtualrealityshow.ueniweb.com/ Maa Khambeswari 9D Cinema
 https://eurokidschatrapur.in/our-classes/  Eurokids Chatrapur
 http://www.thehindubusinessline.com/life/2002/11/18/stories/2002111800050300.htm
Gopalpur Site Visit www.gopalpur.com
Cyclone Phailin Relief www.rapidresponse.org.in

Cities and towns in Ganjam district
Beaches of Odisha